Zaruchevsky (masculine), Zaruchevskaya (feminine), or Zaruchevskoye (neuter) is the name of several rural localities in Arkhangelsk Oblast, Russia:
Zaruchevskaya, Konoshsky District, Arkhangelsk Oblast, a village in Tavrengsky Selsoviet of Konoshsky District
Zaruchevskaya, Primorsky District, Arkhangelsk Oblast, a village in Koskogorsky Selsoviet of Primorsky District
Zaruchevskaya, Ustyansky District, Arkhangelsk Oblast, a village in Rostovsky Selsoviet of Ustyansky District
Zaruchevskaya, Velsky District, Arkhangelsk Oblast, a village in Ust-Velsky Selsoviet of Velsky District